The Little Hemlock River is a  river in Michigan. It is a tributary of the Hemlock River, flowing via the Paint River, Brule River, and Menominee River to Lake Michigan.

See also
List of rivers of Michigan

References

Michigan  Streamflow Data from the USGS

Rivers of Michigan
Tributaries of Lake Michigan